The Adventures of Tom Sawyer is an 1876 novel by Mark Twain about a boy growing up along the Mississippi River. It is set in the 1840s in the town of St. Petersburg, which is based on Hannibal, Missouri, where Twain lived as a boy. In the novel, Tom Sawyer has several adventures, often with his friend Huckleberry Finn. Originally a commercial failure, the book ended up being the best selling of Twain's works during his lifetime.
Though overshadowed by its sequel, Adventures of Huckleberry Finn, the book is considered by many to be a masterpiece of American literature. It was one of the first novels to be written on a typewriter.

Plot

Tom Sawyer is an orphan who lives with his Aunt Polly and his half-brother Sid in the town of St. Petersburg, Missouri, sometime in the 1840s. A fun-loving boy, he frequently skips school to play or go swimming. When Aunt Polly catches him sneaking home late on a Friday evening and discovers that he has been in a fight, she makes him whitewash her fence the next day as punishment.

Tom cleverly persuades several neighborhood children to trade him small trinkets and treasures for the "privilege" of doing his tedious work, using reverse psychology to convince them of its enjoyable nature. Later, Tom trades the trinkets with students in his Sunday school class for tickets, given out for memorizing verses of Scripture. He collects enough tickets to earn a prized Bible from the teacher, despite being one of the worst students in the class and knowing almost nothing of Scripture, eliciting envy from the students and a mixture of pride and shock from the adults.

Tom falls in love with a girl named Becky Thatcher, who is new in town and the daughter of a prominent judge. Tom wins the admiration of Judge Thatcher in the church by obtaining the Bible as a prize, but reveals his ignorance when he is unable to answer basic questions about Scripture. Tom pursues Becky, eventually persuading her to get engaged by kissing her. Their romance soon collapses when she discovers that Tom was engaged to another schoolgirl, Amy Lawrence.

Shortly after Becky spurns Tom, he accompanies Huckleberry Finn, a vagrant boy whom all the other boys admire, to a graveyard at midnight to perform a superstitious ritual intended to heal warts. At the graveyard, they witness a trio of body snatchers, Dr. Robinson, Muff Potter and Injun Joe, robbing a grave. A fight breaks out, during which Robinson knocks Potter unconscious and is then murdered by Injun Joe. When Potter wakes up, Injun Joe puts the weapon in his hand and tells him that he killed Robinson while drunk. Tom and Huck swear a blood oath not to tell anyone about the murder, fearing that Injun Joe will find out and kill them for revenge. Potter is arrested and jailed to await trial, not disputing Injun Joe's claim.

Tom grows bored with school, and he, his friend/classmate Joe Harper, and Huck run away to Jackson's Island in the Mississippi River to begin life as "pirates". While enjoying their freedom, they become aware that the community is scouring the river for their bodies, as the boys are missing and presumed dead. Tom sneaks back home one night to observe the commotion and after a brief moment of remorse at his loved ones' suffering, he is struck by the grand idea of appearing at his funeral. The trio later carries out this scheme, making a sensational and sudden appearance at church in the middle of their joint funeral service, winning the immense respect of their classmates for the stunt. Back in school, Becky rips a page in the school master's anatomy book after Tom startles her, but Tom regains her admiration by claiming responsibility for the damage and accepting the punishment that would have been hers.

During Potter's murder trial, Tom breaks his oath with Huck and testifies for the defense, identifying Injun Joe as the actual culprit. Injun Joe flees the courtroom before he can be apprehended; Potter is acquitted, but Tom and Huck now live in constant fear for their lives. 

Once school lets out for the summer, Tom and Huck decide to hunt for buried treasure in the area. While investigating an abandoned house, they are interrupted by the arrival of two men; one of them is a Spaniard, supposedly deaf-mute, whom the boys recognize as Injun Joe in disguise. He and his partner plan to bury some stolen treasure of their own in the house, but inadvertently discover a large hoard of gold coins while doing so. They decide to move it to a new hiding place, which Tom and Huck are determined to find. One night, Huck follows the men and overhears them planning to break into the home of the wealthy Widow Douglas so Injun Joe can mutilate her face in revenge for being publicly whipped for vagrancy − a punishment handed down by her late husband, a justice of the peace. Huck summons help and thus prevents the break-in, but asks that his name not be made public for fear of retaliation by Injun Joe.

Shortly before Huck stops the crime, Tom goes on a picnic to a local cave with Becky and their classmates. Tom and Becky become lost and wander in the cave for several days, facing starvation and dehydration. Becky becomes extremely dehydrated and weak, and Tom's search for a way out grows more desperate. He encounters Injun Joe by chance, but is not seen. He eventually finds an exit, and he and Becky are joyfully welcomed back to town, learning that they have been missing for three days and traveled five miles from the entrance. Judge Thatcher has the cave's entrance door reinforced and locked. When Tom hears of this action two weeks later, he is horror-stricken, knowing that Injun Joe is still inside. He directs a posse to the cave, where they find Injun Joe dead of starvation just inside the entrance.

A week later, having deduced from Injun Joe's presence that the stolen gold must be hidden in the cave, Tom takes Huck there in search of it. They find the gold, which totals over $12,000 and is invested on their behalf. The Widow Douglas adopts Huck, but he finds the restrictions of a civilized home life painful, attempting to escape back to his vagrant life. He reluctantly returns to the widow, persuaded by Tom's offer to form a high-class robber gang.

Significance 
The novel has elements of humor, satire and social criticism – features that later made Mark Twain one of the most important authors of American literature. Mark Twain describes some autobiographical events in the book. The novel's setting of St. Petersburg is based on Twain's actual boyhood home of Hannibal, near St. Louis, and many of the places in it are real and today support a tourist industry as a result.

The concept of boyhood is developed through Tom's actions, including his runaway adventure with Joe and Huckleberry. To help show how mischievous and messy boyhood was, The Miriam and Ira D. Wallach Division of Art, Prints and Photographs shows a picture of a young boy smoking a pipe, sawing furniture, climbing all over the place, and sleeping. In Twain's novel, Tom and his friend are young when they decide they want to learn how to smoke a pipe. Tom and Joe do this to show just how cool they are to the other boys.

Inception 
Tom Sawyer is Twain's first attempt to write a novel on his own. He had previously written contemporary autobiographical narratives (The Innocents Abroad or The New Pilgrims' Progress, Roughing It) and two short texts called sketches which parody the youth literature of the time. These are The Story of the Good Boy and The Story of the Wicked Little Boy which are satirical texts of a few pages. In the first, a model child is never rewarded and ends up dying before he can declaim his last words which he has carefully prepared. In the second story, an evil little boy steals and lies, like Tom Sawyer, but finishes rich and successful. Tom appears as a mixture of these little boys since he is at the same time a scamp and a boy endowed with a certain generosity.

By the time he wrote Tom Sawyer, Twain was already a successful author based on the popularity of The Innocents Abroad. He owned a large house in Hartford, Connecticut but needed another success to support himself, with a wife and two daughters. He had collaborated on a novel with Charles Dudley Warner, The Gilded Age published in 1874.

He had earlier written an unpublished memoir of his own life on the Mississippi and had corresponded with a boyhood friend, Will Bowen, both of which had evoked many memories and were used as source material.

Twain named his fictional character after a San Francisco fireman whom he met in June 1863. The real Tom Sawyer was a local hero, famous for rescuing 90 passengers after a shipwreck. The two remained friendly during Twain's three-year stay in San Francisco, often drinking and gambling together.

Publication 

In November 1875 Twain gave the manuscript to Elisha Bliss of the American Publishing Company, who sent it to True Williams for the illustrations. A little later, Twain had the text also quickly published at Chatto and Windus of London, in June 1876, but without illustration. Pirate editions appeared very quickly in Canada and Germany. The American Publishing Company finally published its edition in December 1876, which was the first illustrated edition of Tom Sawyer.

These two editions differ slightly. After completing his manuscript, Twain had a copy made of it. It is this copy which was read and annotated by his friend William Dean Howells. Howells and Twain corresponded through fairly informal, handwritten letters discussing many aspects of his works and manuscripts; language choices, character development, as well as racial development and depiction. Twain then made his own corrections based on Howells' comments which he later incorporated in the original manuscript, but some corrections escaped him. The English edition was based on this corrected copy, while the illustrated American edition was based on the original manuscript. To further complicate matters, Twain was personally concerned with the revision of the proofs of the American edition, which he did not do for the English edition. The American edition is therefore considered the authoritative edition.

Criticism 
A third person narrator describes the experiences of the boys, interspersed with occasional social commentary. In its sequel, Adventures of Huckleberry Finn, Mark Twain changes to a first person narrative which takes moral conflicts more personally and thus makes greater social criticism possible. The two other subsequent books, Tom Sawyer Abroad and Tom Sawyer, Detective, are similarly in the first person narrative from the perspective of Huckleberry Finn.

The book has raised controversy for its use of the racial epithet "nigger"; a bowdlerized version aroused indignation among some literary critics, although it's absent in most adaptations.

The book has been criticized for its caricature-like portrayal of Native Americans through the character Injun Joe. He is depicted as malevolent for the sake of malevolence, is not allowed to redeem himself in any way by Twain, dies a pitiful and despairing death in a cave and upon his death is treated as a tourist attraction. Revard suggests that the adults in the novel blame the character's Indian blood as the cause of his evil.

Sequels and other works featuring Tom Sawyer
 Adventures of Huckleberry Finn (1884)
 Tom Sawyer Abroad (1894)
 Tom Sawyer, Detective (1896)

Tom Sawyer, the story's title character, also appears in two other uncompleted sequels: Huck and Tom Among the Indians and Tom Sawyer's Conspiracy. He is also a character in Twain's unfinished Schoolhouse Hill.

Adaptations and influences

Film and television
 Tom Sawyer (1917), directed by William Desmond Taylor, starring Jack Pickford as Tom
 Tom Sawyer (1930), directed by John Cromwell, starring Jackie Coogan as Tom
 Tom Sawyer (1936), Soviet Union version directed by Lazar Frenkel and Gleb Zatvornitsky
 The Adventures of Tom Sawyer (1938), Technicolor film by the Selznick Studio, starring Tommy Kelly as Tom and directed by Norman Taurog; notable is the cave sequence designed by William Cameron Menzies
 Tom Sawyer (1956), a musical episode of the U.S. Steel Hour, written by Frank Luther and starring John Sharpe as Tom and Jimmy Boyd as Huck.
 The Adventures of Tom Sawyer (1960), BBC television series in 7 episodes starring Fred Smith as Tom and Janina Faye as Becky. The series' theme song was "John Gilbert is the Boat", sung by Peggy Seeger
 Les aventures de Tom Sawyer (1968), Romanian/French/West German television miniseries directed by Wolfgang Liebeneiner, starring Roland Demongeot as Tom and Marc Di Napoli as Huck
 Aventurile lui Tom Sawyer (1968), Romanian movie directed by Mircea Albulescu.
 The New Adventures of Huckleberry Finn (1968), a half-hour live-action/animated series produced by Hanna-Barbera Productions
 Las Aventuras de Juliancito (1969), Mexican film
 Tom Sawyer (1973), musical adaptation by Robert B. Sherman and Richard M. Sherman, with Johnny Whitaker in the title role, Jeff East as Huck Finn, Jodie Foster as Becky Thatcher, and Celeste Holm as Aunt Polly.
 Mark Twain's Tom Sawyer (1973), TV movie version sponsored by Dr Pepper, starring Buddy Ebsen as Muff Potter and filmed in Upper Canada Village
 Páni kluci (1976), Czech movie directed by Věra Plívová-Šimková
 Huckleberry Finn and His Friends (1979), TV series
 The Adventures of Tom Sawyer (1980), Japanese anime television series by Nippon Animation, part of the World Masterpiece Theater, aired in the United States on HBO
  (Приключения Тома Сойера и Гекльберри Финна), 1981 Soviet Union 3 episodes version directed by Stanislav Govorukhin
 Rascals and Robbers: The Secret Adventures of Tom Sawyer and Huckleberry Finn (1982), a made-for-TV movie, starring Patrick Creadon as Tom and Anthony Michael Hall as Huck.
 Sawyer and Finn (1983), American television series pilot in which Tom Sawyer (Peter Horton) and Huck Finn (Michael Dudikoff) reunite by chance 10 years after the original story and seek new adventures in the Old West.
 Tom Sawyer (1984), Canadian claymation version produced by Hal Roach studios 
 Wishbone (1995), the first episode "A Tail in Twain" had the title character imagining himself as the title character, with the character of Injun Joe being referred to as "Crazy Joe".
 Tom and Huck (1995), starring Jonathan Taylor Thomas as Tom and Brad Renfro as Huck Finn.
 The Animated Adventures of Tom Sawyer (1998), Canadian version, written by Bob Merrill and directed by William R. Kowalchuk Jr. Uses the voices of Ryan Slater, Christopher Lloyd and Kirsten Dunst.
 Tom Sawyer (2000), animated adaptation featuring the characters as anthropomorphic animals instead of humans with an all-star voice cast, including country singers Rhett Akins, Mark Wills, Lee Ann Womack, Waylon Jennings, and Hank Williams Jr. as well as Betty White.
 Thomas Sawyer, as a young adult, is a character in the movie League of Extraordinary Gentlemen, portrayed by Shane West. Here, Tom is a U.S. Secret Service agent who joins the team's fight against Professor Moriarty.
  (2011), German version, directed by Hermine Huntgeburth.
 Tom Sawyer & Huckleberry Finn (2014), starring Joel Courtney as Tom and Jake T. Austin as Huck.
 Band of Robbers, a 2015 American crime comedy film written and directed by the Nee Brothers.

Theatrical
 From 1932 to 1933, German philosopher Theodor Adorno adapted The Adventures of Tom Sawyer as a ballad opera titled Der Schatz des Indianer-Joe (Treasure of Joe, the Indian). He never finished the musical accompaniment. The libretto was published by his wife Gretel Adorno and student Rolf Tiedemann in 1979.
 In 1956, We're From Missouri, a musical adaptation of The Adventures of Tom Sawyer, with book, music, and lyrics by Tom Boyd, was presented by the students at the Guildhall School of Music and Drama.
 In 1960, Tom Boyd's musical version (re-titled Tom Sawyer) was presented professionally at Theatre Royal Stratford East in London, England, and in 1961 toured provincial theatres in England.
 In 1981, the play The Boys in Autumn by the American dramatist Bernhard Sabath premiered in San Francisco. In the play, Tom Sawyer and Huck Finn meet again as old men. Despite good reviews, the play has remained largely unknown.
 In the 1985 musical Big River by William Hauptman and Roger Miller, Tom is a secondary character, played by John Short from 1985 to 1987.
 In 2001, the musical The Adventures of Tom Sawyer, by Ken Ludwig and Don Schlitz, debuted on Broadway.
 In 2015, the Mark Twain House and Museum selected 17-year-old Noah Altshuler (writer of Making the Move), as Mark Twain Playwright in Residence, to create a modern, meta-fictional adaptation of The Adventures of Tom Sawyer for regional and commercial production.

Ballet
Tom Sawyer: A Ballet in Three Acts premiered on October 14, 2011, at the Kauffman Center for the Performing Arts in Kansas City, Missouri. The score was by composer Maury Yeston, with choreography by William Whitener, artistic director of the Kansas City Ballet. A review in The New York Times observed: "It’s quite likely that this is the first all-new, entirely American three-act ballet: it is based on an American literary classic, has an original score by an American composer and was given its premiere by an American choreographer and company. ... Both the score and the choreography are energetic, robust, warm, deliberately naïve (both ornery and innocent), in ways right for Twain."

Comic books 
The Adventures of Tom Sawyer has been adapted into comic book form many times:
 Tom Sawyer and Huck Finn (Stoll & Edwards Co., 1925) – collection of the comic strip of the same name by Clare Victor Dwiggins, syndicated by the McClure Syndicate beginning in 1918
 Classics Illustrated #50: "The Adventures of Tom Sawyer" (Gilberton, August 1948) – adapted by Harry G. Miller and Aldo Rubano; reprinted extensively
 Dell Junior Treasury #10: "The Adventures of Tom Sawyer" (Dell Comics, October 1957) – adapted by Frank Thorne
 Joyas Literarias Juveniles #60: "Tom Sawyer detective" (Editorial Bruguera, 1972) – adapted by Miguel Cussó and Edmond Fernández Ripoll
 Tom Sawyer (Pendulum Illustrated Classics, Pendulum Press, 1973) – adapted by Irwin Shapiro and E. R. Cruz; reprinted in Marvel Classics Comics #7 (1976) and a number of other places
 Joyas Literarias Juveniles #182: "Las aventuras de Tom Sawyer" (Editorial Bruguera, 1977) – adapted by Juan Manuel González Cremona and Xirinius [as Jaime Juez]
 Classics Illustrated #9: The Adventures of Tom Sawyer (First Comics, May 1990) – adapted by Mike Ploog; reprinted in Classics Illustrated #19 (NBM, 2014)
 Tom Sawyer (An All-Action Classic #2) (Sterling Publishing, 2008) – adapted by Rad Sechrist
 Classics Illustrated Deluxe #4: The Adventures of Tom Sawyer (Papercutz, 2009) – adapted by Jean-David Morvan, Frederique Voulyze, and Severine Le Fevebvre
 The Adventures of Tom Sawyer (Capstone Publishers, 2007) – adapted by Daniel Strickland
 Manga Classics: The Adventures of Tom Sawyer (UDON Entertainment Manga Classics, April 2018) – adapted by Crystal Silvermoon and Kuma Chan

Video games
 The Adventures of Tom Sawyer, an action-platformer for the Nintendo Entertainment System. It was released by SeTa in February 1989 in Japan and August that same year in North America.
 Square's Tom Sawyer, a role-playing video game produced by Square. It was released in March 1989 for Japan on the Famicom.

Internet
On November 30, 2011, to celebrate Twain's 176th birthday, the Google Doodle was a scene from The Adventures of Tom Sawyer.

Theme park attractions
An opening day attraction at Six Flags Over Mid America (Now Six Flags St Louis) was Injun Joe's Cave which told the story of Tom Sawyer and Becky Thatcher as they escaped from Injun Joe after his murdering of Dr. Robinson. They attraction was open until 1978 when it was replaced with "The Time Tunnel". To this day, the building that housed this former attraction is home to "Justice League Battle for Metropolis.

See also

 Adventures of Huckleberry Finn
 List of Tom Sawyer characters
 Mark Twain bibliography
 National Tom Sawyer Days
 The Story of a Bad Boy

References

Further reading
 Beaver, Harold, et al., eds. "The role of structure in Tom Sawyer and Huckleberry Finn." Huckleberry Finn. Vol. 1. No. 8. (New York: Johns Hopkins Textual Studies, 1987) pp. 1–57.
 Beringer, Alex. "Humbug History: The Politics of Puffery in Tom Sawyer's Conspiracy." Mark Twain Annual 14.1 (2016): 114–126. Online
 Blair, Walter. "On the Structure of" Tom Sawyer"." Modern Philology 37.1 (1939): 75-88.
 Buchen, Callista. "Writing the Imperial Question at Home: Huck Finn and Tom Sawyer Among the Indians Revisited." Mark Twain Annual 9 (2011): 111–129. online
 Caron, James E. "The Arc of Mark Twain's Satire, or Tom Sawyer the Moral Snag." American Literary Realism 51.1 (2018): 36–58. Online
 Dillingham, William B. "Setting and Theme in Tom Sawyer." Mark Twain Journal 12.2 (1964): 6-8 online.
 Gribben, Alan. "Tom Sawyer, Tom Canty, and Huckleberry Finn: The Boy Book and Mark Twain." Mark Twain Journal 55.1/2 (2017): 127-144 online
 Hill, Hamlin L. "The Composition and the Structure of Tom Sawyer." American Literature 32.4 (1961): 379-392  online.
 Roberts, James L. CliffsNotes Twain's The adventures of Tom Sawyer (2001) online free to borrow
 Simpson, Claude Mitchell, ed. Twentieth century interpretations of Adventures of Huckleberry Finn: a collection of critical essays (Prentice Hall, 1968).
 Tibbetts, John C., And James M, Welsh, eds. The Encyclopedia of Novels Into Film (2005) pp 3–5.
 Towers, Tom H. "I Never Thought We Might Want to Come Back": Strategies of Transcendence in" Tom Sawyer." Modern Fiction Studies 21.4 (1975): 509-520 online.

External links

 
 
 
 The Adventures of Tom Sawyer. The digitized copy of the first American edition from Internet Archive (1876).
 First edition illustrations by True Williams 

1876 American novels
Novels by Mark Twain
American children's novels
American adventure novels adapted into films
Novels set in the 1840s
American picaresque novels
Novels set in Missouri
Southern United States in fiction
American novels adapted into television shows
1870s children's books
Third-person narrative novels